Solomon Allen ( – ) was an officer during the American Revolutionary War and itinerant preacher. 

He was a brother of Moses Allen and Thomas Allen, who were chaplains in the revolutionary army, while he fought as a soldier and rose to the rank of major. As lieutenant he commanded the guard that took Major Andre to West Point. After the war he was engaged in suppressing Shays' rebellion. At the age of forty he became a religious convert, and at fifty began the life of a missionary preacher. For twenty years he circulated among the new settlements of western New York, where he was greatly respected for his zealous devotion and self-sacrifice. A "Sketch of the Last Hours of Solomon Allen" was written by J. N. Danforth.

Solomon Allen died on 28 January 1821 in New York.

References

1751 births
1821 deaths
People of the American Revolution
People from Northampton, Massachusetts
Religious converts
Massachusetts in the American Revolution